Niqula Haddad was a Syrian Socialist, and was brother in law to Farah Antun.

Early life 
Niqula Haddad was born into an orthodox family in 1870.

Education 
Haddad went to the American secondary school at Sidon, and later studied pharmacy at the Syrian Protestant College in Beirut, as a pharmacist.

Career 
Sometime after 1900, Haddad would move to Egypt and marry Farah Antun's sister, Ruza. Later on, he would work for his brother in law on his journal, al-Jami'ah, in New York. After the failure of the journal, Haddad would go back to Egypt and continue his writing career there, and would eventually write a ladies' magazine, al-Sayyidat, from 1948 to 1950. Sometime around the magazine, he was also editing for the magazine al-Muqtataf. In 1906 he published a novel Hawa al-Jadida aw Yvonne Monar (The New Eve, or Yvonne Monar)

Politics 
Like some other prominent socialists, Haddad believed in a planned economy, and pointed to the Egyptian governments' control over utilities like railroads and telephones as evidence for the plausibility of such a thing. Haddad believed the implementation of socialism should be through democratic means, where a socialist party educates the people sufficiently to win power in the government and implement socialist policies.

Death 
Niqula Haddad died in 1954.

References

1870 births
1954 deaths
Lebanese Christians